A list of films produced in Hong Kong in 1983:

1983

External links
IMDB list of Hong Kong films
Hong Kong films of 1983 at HKcinemamagic.com

1983
Lists of 1983 films by country or language
1983 in Hong Kong